John Zimmerman may refer to:

John Zimmerman (politician), mayor of Lancaster, Pennsylvania from 1856 to 1857
John Zimmerman (figure skater) (born 1973), American professional pair skater
, German historian
John C. Zimmerman Sr. (1835–1935), mayor of the City of Flint 1895–1896
John G. Zimmerman (1927–2002), American magazine photographer
John R. Zimmerman, meteorologist, see Zimmerman Island
Long John Nebel, an influential New York City talk radio show host